Microsoft Whiteboard is a free multi-platform application, as well as an online service and a feature in Microsoft Teams, which simulates a virtual whiteboard and enables real-time collaboration between users.

Overview and features 
Microsoft Whiteboard allows users to draw on a virtual whiteboard using input methods such as a stylus pen or a mouse and keyboard, and write down notes, draw connections between shareable ideas and interact in real time. Microsoft Whiteboard is available to download on the following platforms and devices:

 Microsoft Windows (on Windows 10 or above)
 Android
 Apple iOS
 Surface Hub devices

It is also available on the web and as a feature in Microsoft Teams.

Microsoft Whiteboard allows users with Microsoft accounts to view, edit and share whiteboards using the provided tools and options. The feature set includes tools for drawing, shapes and media. Drawing in Microsoft Whiteboard is called inking. It works both on mobile devices and computers. The inking toolbar has customizable pencils, as well as a ruler, a highlighter, an eraser and an object selector. Whiteboard can recognize shapes drawn by hand and straighten them. Holding the Shift key on a computer while inking draws straight lines.

Microsoft Whiteboard has keyboard shortcuts for some functions.

Additional features include inserting sticky notes, text boxes, stickers, as well as images. Grid lines and colors are adjustable. There are different templates, which can be inserted into the whiteboard. Users can also share their reactions. A feature limited to boards created in Microsoft Teams, is the ability to make them read-only; other participants from the meeting cannot edit them.

Reviews 
PC Magazine rated Microsoft Whiteboard a 3.5 out of 5, praising the app's free availability and plentiful templates. It compared it to other, paid whiteboarding solutions, and concludes that Microsoft offers the best free one. Some of the cons, described by PCMag, include the inability to view boards without a Microsoft account, and the inability to create custom templates.

See also
 Whiteboarding

References

External links
 Official website (Whiteboard web app)
 Whiteboard for Android - Apps on Google Play

Microsoft software
Application software
Collaborative software
Computer-mediated communication